The 2008 United States Senate elections were held on November 4, 2008, with 35 of the 100 seats in the Senate being contested. Thirty-three seats were up for regular elections; the winners were eligible to serve six-year terms from January 3, 2009, to January 3, 2015, as members of Class 2. There were also two special elections, the winners of those seats would finish the terms that ended January 3, 2013. The presidential election, which was won by Democrat Barack Obama, elections for all House of Representatives seats; elections for several gubernatorial elections; and many state and local elections occurred on the same date.

Going into these elections, the Senate consisted of 49 Democrats, 49 Republicans, and two Independents who caucused with the Democrats, giving the Democratic caucus the slightest 51–49 majority. Of the seats up for election in 2008, 23 were held by Republicans and 12 by Democrats. The Republicans, who openly conceded early on that they would not be able to regain the majority in this election, lost eight seats. Democratic candidates defeated Republican incumbents in Alaska; New Hampshire; North Carolina; Oregon; and, after a lengthy recount process, Minnesota. Additionally, they won Republican-held open seats in Colorado, New Mexico, and Virginia. This election was the second cycle in a row in which no seats switched from Democratic to Republican, and the first since 1990 in which the Democrats retained all their seats. In addition, this was the largest Democratic Senate gain since 1986, where they also won eight seats. These elections marked the first time since 1964 in which a Democratic presidential candidate who won the White House had a Senate coattail effect. As of 2023, this is the latest round in which a newly-elected U.S. Senator, Kay Hagan, has since died.

Democrats held at least 57 seats as a result of the election. When the new senators were first sworn in, the balance was 58–41 in favor of the Democrats, with the unresolved election in Minnesota causing that seat to remain vacant. The April 2009 party switch of Pennsylvania senator Arlen Specter from Republican to Democrat and the July 2009 resolution of the Minnesota election in favor of Democrat Al Franken increased the Democratic majority to 60–40 (providing the Democrats, including the two Independent senators who caucus with them, a supermajority and thus able to hypothetically over-ride any filibusters). Republicans gained a seat in a January 2010 special election in Massachusetts, thereby making the balance 59–41 before the start of the next election cycle.

As of 2023, this is the last time Democrats won U.S. Senate seats in Alaska, Arkansas, Iowa, Louisiana, North Carolina, and South Dakota.

Results summary 

Summary of the November 4, 2008, United States Senate election results

Sources:
 Clerk of the U.S. House of Representatives
 U.S. Senate Popular Vote and FEC Total Receipts by Party, via TheGreenPapers.com

Change in composition

Before the elections

After the elections

Beginning of the first session

Race summary

Special elections during the 110th Congress 
In these special elections, the winner was seated during 2008 or before January 3, 2009, sorted by election date, then state, then class.

Elections leading to the next Congress 
In these general elections, the winners were elected for the term beginning January 3, 2009; ordered by state.

All of the elections involved the Class 2 seats.

Special elections during the next Congress 
There were no special elections in 2009.

Closest races 

In nine races the margin of victory was under 10%. However, Georgia proceeded to a runoff election where the Republican candidate won by over 10%.

South Dakota was the tipping point state, decided by a margin of 25.0%.

Freshmen 

There were 20 freshman Senators in the 111th United States Congress. Ten were elected on November 4, 2008. In addition, two freshmen were appointed to fill vacancies created by Barack Obama's and Joe Biden's resignations to become president and vice president. Two more freshmen were appointed to the Senate as a consequence of the appointment of Hillary Clinton to be Secretary of State and Ken Salazar to be Secretary of the Interior. George LeMieux was appointed to replace Mel Martinez upon his resignation. A temporary interim senator, Paul G. Kirk, was appointed to the seat of Edward M. Kennedy upon his death. He was replaced by Scott Brown in the 2010 United States Senate special election in Massachusetts.

 Mark Begich (D-AK)
 Al Franken (D-MN)
 Kay Hagan (D-NC)
 Mike Johanns (R-NE)
 Jeff Merkley (D-OR)
 Jim Risch (R-ID)
 Jeanne Shaheen (D-NH)
 Mark Udall (D-CO)
 Tom Udall (D-NM)
 Mark Warner (D-VA)
 Roland Burris (D-IL, Obama's successor), appointed in 2008
 Ted Kaufman (D-DE, Biden's successor), appointed in 2009
 Kirsten Gillibrand (D-NY, Clinton's successor), appointed in 2009
 Michael Bennet (D-CO, Salazar's successor), appointed in 2009
 George LeMieux (R-FL, Martinez's successor), appointed in 2009
 Paul G. Kirk (D-MA, Kennedy's successor), appointed in 2009
 Scott Brown (R-MA, Paul Kirk's successor), elected in January 2010
 Carte Goodwin (D-WV, Byrd's successor) appointed in 2010
 Chris Coons (D-DE, Kaufman's successor), elected in 2010
 Joe Manchin (D-WV Goodwin's successor) elected in 2010
 Mark Kirk (R-IL, Burris's successor), elected in 2010

Hill committees' role 
Each major party has Hill committees that work to support its candidates for the House and Senate, chiefly by providing funds. On the Senate side, the committees are the Democratic Senatorial Campaign Committee (DSCC) and the National Republican Senatorial Committee (NRSC). In this cycle the DSCC was more successful at fundraising. As of June 30, 2008, data from the Federal Election Commission showed the NRSC with $24.6 million on hand, as compared with the DSCC's $43 million. The NRSC chair, senator John Ensign, took the unusual step of chastising the Republican Senators who, like him, were not facing re-election, and who he thought should have done more to help raise money for their colleagues.

Gains and losses

Retirements
Five Republicans retired rather than seek re-election.

Defeats
Five Republicans sought re-election but lost in the general election.

Alabama 

Alabama senator Jeff Sessions sought re-election to a third term. Johnny Swanson announced his candidacy in March 2006 for the Democratic nomination.

Despite voting heavily for Bush in 2004, Alabama still had a strong Democratic presence; Democrats controlled majorities of both chambers in the state legislature. Commissioner of Agriculture and Industries Ron Sparks appeared to be preparing for a run, but on June 12, 2007, Sparks announced that he would not seek the Senate seat, in order to avoid a primary battle with state senator Vivian Davis Figures. Figures has won elections in the Republican-leaning Mobile area. In the Democratic primary, Figures won the nomination and face Sessions in November.

Not on the ballot, but running a write-in campaign, was Darryl W. Perry, the 2004 Libertarian Party nominee for Pennsylvania State Treasurer and 2007 candidate for Mayor of Birmingham, Alabama. Perry was endorsed by Alabama Statesmen, Boston Tea Party, and Christians for Life and Liberty.

Sessions defeated Figures, taking 63% of the vote to Figures's 37%

Alaska 

Dispelling rumors that he would retire due to advanced age (he was 84 years old on election day) and ongoing federal investigations into his conduct, senator Ted Stevens filed papers for re-election for an eighth term.

An ex-oil company executive, Bill Allen, paid for part of the renovation costs on Stevens's personal residence. The FBI investigated the remodeling of Stevens home by Veco Corp., which is part of a broader corruption investigation involving Stevens's son, former State Senate President Ben Stevens. Two former Veco executives have plead guilty to paying the younger Stevens $242,000 in bribes. On July 30, 2007, the IRS and FBI raided Stevens's home in Alaska. On September 14, 2007, former Veco CEO Bill Allen testified at the trial of former State House Speaker Pete Kott that Veco paid people working to double the size of Stevens's home.

On July 29, 2008, a federal grand jury indicted Stevens on seven felony counts for making false statements, and on October 26, a jury found Stevens guilty on all charges.

The Democratic candidate was Anchorage Mayor Mark Begich, the son of popular former Democratic Representative Nick Begich. Begich announced his candidacy for the Senate seat on April 22, 2008.

On October 19, 2007, the AP reported that despite the allegations and FBI probe, several veteran GOP Senators—including Orrin Hatch (R-UT), Kay Bailey Hutchison (R-TX), and Kit Bond (R-MO)—donated enough money to Stevens's re-election campaign to make it one of Stevens's most successful fund raising quarters ever.

Stevens's conviction on seven felony counts of corruption put his re-election bid in serious jeopardy, coming just over a week before the election, though Stevens appealed the conviction. Nevertheless, Stevens was narrowly ahead in the vote count after election day, with only about two-thirds of all votes counted. It only became clear Begich had prevailed when early votes, absentee ballots, and questioned ballots were counted.

On November 18, the race was called for Begich, who won with 47.8% to Stevens's 46.5%. Stevens was the most senior U.S. Senator to ever lose re-election, defeating Warren Magnuson's 1980 record. As of 2023, Stevens still holds this record.

On April 1, 2009, U.S. Attorney General Eric Holder, citing serious prosecutorial misconduct during the trial, decided to drop all charges against Stevens—an action that vacated his conviction.

Arkansas 

Despite being a first-term senator in a state George W. Bush won twice, Democrat Mark Pryor faced no opposition from Republicans in his re-election bid. Although Bush carried the state twice, Arkansas Democrats swept the seven state races held in the 2006 general election. Pryor is the son of longtime U.S. senator and former Arkansas Governor David Pryor. It was rumored that Lt. Governor Bill Halter would challenge Pryor in the primary, but Halter declined to file as a candidate. Rebekah Kennedy of the Green Party was Pryor's only opposition. Pryor won on election day, with 79.53% of the vote. Kennedy took 20.47%.

Colorado 

On January 15, 2007, incumbent senator Wayne Allard (R) announced he would not seek re-election, honoring his pledge to serve no more than two terms.

Former Representative Bob Schaffer of Fort Collins was the Republican nominee. Former Denver Broncos quarterback John Elway was rumored to be considering a run, but declined to do so. Other possible Republican candidates included former Congressman Scott McInnis and Colorado Attorney General John Suthers.

The Democratic nominee was 2nd district Congressman Mark Udall of Boulder who announced on January 15, 2007, that he would seek the seat and did not draw significant primary opposition.

Other candidates included Bob Kinsey of Denver as the Green Party nominee, Douglas "Dayhorse" Campbell as the American Constitution Party's nominee, and Independent candidate Buddy Moore, unaffiliated any party.

On Election Day, Udall defeated Schaffer 53% to 43%.

Delaware 

On August 23, 2008, the Democratic nominee for President, Barack Obama, announced that Biden would be joining him on the ticket as the vice presidential nominee. Delaware law allowed Biden to run for Vice President and senator at the same time, so he would have kept the Senate seat if the presidential ticket had lost. In 1988 and 2000, the Democratic Vice-Presidential nominees Lloyd Bentsen and Joe Lieberman, ran similarly for their seat in Texas and Connecticut, respectively. On November 4, 2008, Barack Obama won the presidential election, making Biden the next VP. Biden vacated his senate seat shortly after the election, allowing for the Governor of Delaware to appoint a successor. There was speculation as to whether the outgoing Governor, Ruth Ann Minner, or the incoming Governor-elect Jack Markell would make the appointment, and if Biden's son, Delaware Attorney General Beau Biden would receive the appointment. On November 24, 2008, Governor Minner appointed Biden's longtime Chief of Staff Ted Kaufman to fill the seat. Kaufman subsequently announced that he would not seek election to a full term in 2010, effectively making him a caretaker. Biden's Republican opponent in the Senate race, conservative political commentator Christine O'Donnell, tried to make an issue of Biden's dual campaigns, claiming that serving his constituents is not important to him. 

Biden was re-elected with 65% of the vote, or 257,484 votes. O'Donnell received 140,584 votes (35% of the vote).

Georgia 

In the 2008 election, first-term incumbent Republican senator Saxby Chambliss was opposed primarily by Democrat Jim Martin, as well as third party candidates, including Libertarian Allen Buckley and Eleanor Garcia of the Socialist Workers Party.

Martin, current Georgia Commissioner of Human Resources, former member of the Georgia General Assembly, Vietnam War veteran, and 2006 candidate for lieutenant governor, secured the Democratic nomination after defeating DeKalb County CEO Vernon Jones by a 59% to 41% margin in the August 5 run-off election.

In December 2007, Chambliss had an approval rating of 53% and a disapproval rating of 34% according to Strategic Vision, a Republican polling firm. For most of the campaign, Chambliss maintained a comfortable lead in most polls. However, in the weeks leading up to the 2008 general election, polls showed the race tightening, reflecting a general nationwide trend.

On November 4, 2008, Chambliss received 49.8% of the vote, with Martin about 3% behind and Buckley receiving 3% of the vote. However, Georgia law stated that if no candidate receives a simple majority of the popular vote, then the election will be decided in a run-off. On December 2, 2008, Chambliss won the run-off with 57% of vote to Martin's 43%.

Idaho 

On September 1, 2007, senator Larry Craig announced his intent to resign from the Senate effective September 30, 2007. The announcement followed by just six days the disclosure that he had pleaded guilty on August 1, 2007, to a reduced misdemeanor charge arising out of his arrest on June 11 at the Minneapolis airport for soliciting sex with a man in the restroom. Craig found almost no support among Republicans in his home state or Washington. On October 4, 2007, senator Craig announced he will not seek re-election, but would remain in office until the end of his term.

Lieutenant Governor Jim Risch was the Republican candidate; U.S. Army veteran and former congressman Larry LaRocco was the Democratic candidate. Risch and LaRocco ran against each other in the 2006 Lieutenant Governor race, which Risch won by a wide margin. Libertarian Kent Marmon also ran. The last Democratic senator from Idaho was Frank Church, who was defeated in the Republican landslide of 1980 after serving four terms.

Risch won the election with approximately 58% of the vote.

Illinois 

Senate Majority Whip Richard Durbin remained favored in Illinois. He sought to be re-elected in a state that has steadily become more Democratic since 1992. CQpolitics.com rated the contest as "safe Democrat."

Physician Steve Sauerberg of La Grange won the February 5 Republican primary. Kathy Cummings, a retired special education teacher was nominated via convention by the Green Party. Chad Koppie, a retired airline pilot and vice-chairman of the Illinois Center Right Coalition, was the nominee of the Constitution Party.

Durbin won with 68% of the vote. Sauerberg had 29%.

Iowa 

In a state that had been trending to the Democratic party recently, senator Tom Harkin faced the Republican nominee, small business owner Christopher Reed, whom he defeated with 63% of the vote to Reed's 37%.

Kansas 

Senator Pat Roberts sought re-election to a third term. Although Kansas has not elected a Democrat to the Senate since 1932, former Democratic Congressman and army veteran Jim Slattery was nominated to run against Roberts. Pat Roberts currently has an approval rating of 56%.

Roberts was re-elected with 60% to Slattery's 36%.

Kentucky 

Democrats made Senate Minority Leader, four-term senator Mitch McConnell of Kentucky a target due to his leadership of Senate Republicans and his ties to President Bush, as well as his mediocre approval rating in the state, which was below 50%.

Businessman and U.S. Army veteran Bruce Lunsford, who lost the 2007 Democratic gubernatorial primary to Governor Steve Beshear, was the Democratic nominee.

Once thought to be secure in his re-election, McConnell's lead had shrunk dramatically thanks to the financial crisis and polling showed the race tightening between him and Lunsford. Nevertheless, McConnell was re-elected by a margin of 53% to 47%.

Louisiana 

Incumbent Mary Landrieu was elected in 1996 following a recount and was narrowly re-elected in 2002 in a runoff election. Since those elections, Democrats have had to endure the loss of some reliable voters because Hurricane Katrina dispersed many African-Americans from New Orleans, although the vast majority still live within Louisiana. The state has become more Republican over the past 12 years. Louisiana elected David Vitter in 2004, the state's first Republican senator since Reconstruction, as well as Republican Bobby Jindal as the first Indian-American Governor in the country's history in 2007. Louisiana's electoral votes easily went to George W. Bush in 2000 and 2004.

On August 27, 2007, state Treasurer John Neely Kennedy announced he was switching parties from Democrat to Republican. On November 29, after being personally recruited by Vitter and former Bush administration official Karl Rove, Kennedy announced plans to challenge Landrieu in 2008.

In the end, Landrieu was re-elected with 52% of the vote, Kennedy having 46%.

Maine 

In Maine, Susan Collins sought a third term in the Senate. She has maintained a high approval rating, and also in her favor is the landslide re-election of Maine's senior Senator, Olympia Snowe, who had the largest margin of victory of any GOP Senate candidate - besides the largely unopposed Richard Lugar (R-IN) - in the 2006 election cycle. Collins was re-elected with 58% of the vote in 2002 over State Sen. Chellie Pingree. Fellow senator Joe Lieberman, citing his status as an independent, endorsed Collins in her 2008 re-election bid.

On May 8, 2007, Rep. Tom Allen (ME-1) announced his candidacy on his website. He had already expressed interest in running and had been building the apparatus necessary to wage a Senate campaign.

Collins won on election day with 61% of the vote, compared to 39% for Allen.

Massachusetts 

Incumbent John Kerry sought another Senate term in Massachusetts. Republican author and conservative activist Jerome Corsi, known for his public criticism of Kerry, had stated that he would run for the seat in 2008 but later changed his mind. Jim Ogonowski, a retired Air Force pilot who was closely defeated by now-Representative Niki Tsongas in a 2007 special election, was running against Kerry. but failed to obtain the required candidacy signatures. The Republican challenger turned out to be Jeff Beatty, an ex-Army Delta Force officer who garnered 30% of the vote in a challenge to Democratic Congressman Bill Delahunt in 2006. Kerry was challenged by defense attorney Edward O'Reilly for the Democratic nomination, winning 69% of the vote to O'Reilly's 31%.

Kerry won with 66% of the vote to Beatty's 31%. Libertarian Robert J. Underwood had 3%.

Michigan 

With the Democratic Party takeover of Capitol Hill in the 2006 midterm elections, senator Carl Levin had become one of the most powerful people in Washington as chairman of the Senate Armed Services Committee. He was expected to easily win re-election.

Challenging Levin were Republican State Representative Jack Hoogendyk, Green candidate Harley G. Mikkelson, US Taxpayers' candidate Mike Nikitin, Libertarian professor Scotty Boman, and Natural Law's candidate Doug Dern.

Levin won re-election with 63% of the vote, to Hoogendyk's 34%.

Minnesota 

2007 year-end reports filed with the Federal Election Commission showed that Al Franken had raised $7.04 million through December 31, 2007, while Norm Coleman had raised $6.24 million. Year-end cash on hand was $6.04 million for Coleman and $3.10 million for Franken.

Note: The ±% column reflects the change in total number of votes won by each party from the previous election. Additionally, votes cast for Paul Wellstone in the 2002 election are not factored into the DFL's total from that year.

The 2008 U.S. Senate election in Minnesota featured first-term Republican incumbent senator Norm Coleman, Democrat Al Franken, a comedian and radio personality, and former U.S. senator Dean Barkley, a member of the Independence Party of Minnesota.

A December 2007 poll showed Coleman's approval rating among Minnesota voters at 53%. The seat was heavily targeted by the Democratic Senatorial Campaign Committee because of Minnesota's Democratic leanings and recent Democratic gains in national and statewide elections. These factors, coupled with a national political climate favorable to Democrats, made the Minnesota Senate race one of the most competitive and closely watched of the cycle.

Franken announced his candidacy on February 14, 2007, more than 20 months before the election. Jack Nelson-Pallmeyer, a professor at the University of St. Thomas (St. Paul, Minnesota), joined the race in October 2007. Attorney Mike Ciresi, an unsuccessful candidate in the 2000 Democratic U.S. Senate primary, was considered a serious candidate, but withdrew from the race on March 10, 2008, clearing the path for Franken to secure the party's nomination.

Barkley, who had briefly been appointed Senator after the death of Paul Wellstone in 2002, ran under the banner of the Independence Party, the largest third party in Minnesota. He was included in most of the debates and ultimately received 15% of the vote in the general election, a strong showing for a third party candidate. It is not clear whether Barkley detracted more votes from Coleman or Franken.

Polls over the course of the campaign indicated that the race was very competitive, with many polls showing Franken and Coleman virtually tied or within the margin of error, as well as several polls showing each candidate with a significant lead at one point or another. The presence of a serious third party candidate further complicated matters.

On November 4, 2008, Coleman received 1,211,590 votes to Franken's 1,211,375 votes, a margin of 215 votes, far less than 0.1%, thereby triggering an automatic recount. Barkley received 437,404 votes, about 15% of total votes cast.

On January 3, 2009, with the recount apparently completed, Franken had an unofficial lead of 225 votes, but former senator Coleman's attorneys contested the official results in the courts. During the recount process, Minnesota was represented by only one senator, Amy Klobuchar.

On April 13, 2009, a three-judge panel ruled that Al Franken received the most votes in Minnesota's 2008 Senate race and ruled against Coleman's claims on all counts. Coleman appealed this decision. On June 30, 2009, the Minnesota Supreme Court ruled unanimously that Al Franken received the most votes, and Norm Coleman conceded defeat after the ruling, allowing Al Franken to be Senator-elect of Minnesota. Franken was sworn in as Minnesota's junior senator on July 7.

Mississippi

Mississippi (regular) 

Incumbent Republican Thad Cochran announced that he would seek re-election for a sixth term. Cochran, who has not faced serious opposition since he was re-elected in 1984, faced Democratic state Representative Erik R. Fleming, whom he defeated with 61% of the vote.

Mississippi (special) 

Roger Wicker, formerly the representative of Mississippi's 1st congressional district, was appointed by Governor Haley Barbour on December 31, 2007, to fill the vacancy caused by the December 18 resignation of Trent Lott. It had been speculated that Lott wished to resign before a new lobbying reform law, effective the first day of 2008, took effect; having resigned before the end of 2007, Lott may become a lobbyist in 2009 instead of 2010. Controversy arose when Barbour called for the special election to be held on the same day as the general election. As a result, Mississippi's Attorney General Jim Hood challenged Barbour in court, claiming that the special election needed to be held within 100 days of Lott's resignation, as per state law. Initially, a Mississippi Circuit Court judge sided with Hood, ruling that the election take place on or before March 19, 2008. However, Barbour filed an appeal to the Mississippi Supreme Court, which overturned the earlier ruling and set the special election for November 4, 2008.

Democratic former Governor Ronnie Musgrove challenged Wicker. Another Democrat, former Congressman Ronnie Shows, also filed to run, but he withdrew in February 2008 and endorsed Musgrove. Wicker beat Musgrove 55% to 45%.

Montana 

Senator Max Baucus was a popular Democrat in Montana, representing a state that has long been fairly Republican but also receptive to Democrats in state and local elections. President Bush won Montana by more than 20 points in both 2000 and 2004, but Montana also had a popular Democratic governor, Brian Schweitzer, and a newly elected Democratic junior senator, Jon Tester. Baucus was not expected to face a significant challenge from the 85-year-old Republican nominee, Bob Kelleher, who surprised observers by winning the June 3 Republican primary despite supporting a number of positions that put him to the political left of Baucus, such as nationalization of the American oil and gas industry.

Baucus easily won re-election, taking 73% of the vote, with Kelleher taking 27%.

Nebraska 

In Nebraska, incumbent Republican Chuck Hagel chose to retire rather than run for a third term.

Former Governor Mike Johanns, who recently resigned as Agriculture Secretary, was the Republican nominee, having defeated opponent Pat Flynn 87-13 in the primary. Scott Kleeb, 2006 candidate for Nebraska's 3rd congressional district, defeated businessman Tony Raimondo, a former Republican, by a wide margin in the Democratic primary.

Nebraska state Green Party Co-Chairman Steve Larrick was also a candidate, as was Kelly Rosberg of the Nebraska Party.

Johanns won, taking 58% of the vote, with Kleeb taking 40%

New Hampshire 

Incumbent Republican John E. Sununu represented the swing state of New Hampshire. The state traditionally leaned Republican, but John Kerry from neighboring Massachusetts narrowly won the state in the 2004 Presidential election. New Hampshire also saw major Democratic gains in the 2006 elections, when Democrats took both of the previously Republican-held House seats, the gubernatorial race with a record vote share of 74%, and majorities in the State House and Senate, giving them concurrent control of both bodies for the first time since 1874. However, New Hampshire had not elected a Democratic United States senator since 1975.

Sununu's 2002 opponent, former Governor Jeanne Shaheen, decided to run and was generally considered to be a very formidable challenger. Three consecutive monthly Rasmussen Reports poll showed Shaheen defeating Sununu by 49% to 41%. Prior to Shaheen's entry, Portsmouth Mayor Steve Marchand, Katrina Swett, wife of former Democratic congressman Richard Swett, and former astronaut Jay Buckey had announced that they were running for the Democratic nomination. After Shaheen's entry, however, all three withdrew and endorsed the former governor.

On election day, Shaheen defeated Sununu, 52% to 45%.

New Jersey 

Incumbent Democrat Frank Lautenberg sought re-election in 2008, though he was 84. In the Primary, Lautenberg soundly defeated Representative Rob Andrews (NJ-1) by a margin of 62% to 32%. In November 2006, the senator had the lowest approval rating of any Democrat running for re-election in 2008 (with 39% approving and 45% disapproving), with his approval standing only at 42% as of September 2007 with voters saying he does not deserve re-election 46%-36%. The Republican nominee was former Congressman and 1996 senatorial candidate Dick Zimmer.

Sara Lobman of the Socialist Workers Party and Independent Anthony Fisher were also declared candidates. Furthermore, in the wake of the financial crisis, Carl Peter Klapper entered the race as a write-in candidate.

Lautenberg won re-election, winning 56%-42%.

New Mexico 

While senator Pete Domenici had declared that he would seek re-election in New Mexico, he changed his mind and announced on October 4, 2007, that he was retiring at the end of his current term due to a degenerative brain disorder. Domenici normally would have been expected to win re-election easily, having won his current term with the support of two out of three New Mexico voters; however, he was to be investigated by the Senate Ethics Committee for his role in firing U.S. Attorney David Iglesias. Domenici's role in the developing scandal had reduced the probability he would have been re-elected, and a SurveyUSA poll showed his approval ratings at 41%, with 54% disapproving. The potential scandal may have also contributed to his decision to leave the Senate.

Tom Udall, the popular Representative from New Mexico's 3rd District, was the Democratic nominee. The Republican nominee was Rep. Steve Pearce, who represented the more conservative southern part of the state.

When asked whether the Republicans were abandoning their hopes of holding onto Domenici's seat, senator John Ensign, the chairman of the National Republican Senatorial Committee, responded that "You don’t waste money on races that don’t need it or you can’t win."

Udall won the election with 61% of the vote, with Pearce taking 39%.

North Carolina 

In North Carolina, there had been rumors that senator Elizabeth Dole would retire from the Senate and run for governor, but she said in 2006 that she intended to run for re-election. There was early speculation that North Carolina Governor Mike Easley might be pressured into running against her but this did not come to pass. The Democratic nominee was state senator Kay Hagan, who defeated Jim Neal and Dustin Lassiter in the Democratic primary. A Rasmussen poll released May 11, 2008, showed Hagan leading Dole by a statistically insignificant margin, 48% - 47%, suggesting a competitive race. Hagan's poll numbers continued to best Dole's, however, and Hagan defeated Dole by a wider than expected margin of 53% to 44%.

Oklahoma 

In Oklahoma, senator Jim Inhofe announced that he would seek a third full term. A September 2007 poll put Inhofe's approval rating at 47%, with 41% disapproving of his performance. Inhofe's opponent was State senator Andrew Rice. Inhofe was re-elected, 57% to 39%.

Oregon 

Senator Gordon Smith of Oregon ran for a third term. He defeated ophthalmologist Gordon Leitch in the May 20 Republican primary. Smith faced Democratic Oregon House of Representatives Speaker Jeff Merkley in the November general election. Merkley beat longtime Democratic activist Steve Novick and three other candidates in a hotly contested primary.

In a July 16, 2008, poll, Merkley overtook Smith for the first time 43% to 41%.

On November 6, 2008, Jeff Merkley was projected the winner of the contest, with 48.9% to Smith's 45.6%. Gordon Smith formally conceded soon afterward.

Rhode Island 

In Rhode Island, Democratic senator Jack Reed had an approval rating of 66% in November 2006. National Journal has declared that "Reed is probably the safest incumbent of the 2008 cycle". Reed's opponent was Robert Tingle, a pit manager at the Foxwoods Resort Casino in Connecticut, whom Reed defeated in his re-election campaign in 2002.

Reed won the election, with 73% of the vote.

South Carolina 

Senator Lindsey Graham, as a popular Republican incumbent in strongly conservative South Carolina, had been considered unlikely to be vulnerable to a Democratic challenge. Graham's support for a compromise immigration bill, however, drew an angry response from many South Carolina conservatives, who recruited Buddy Witherspoon, a former South Carolina Republican Party leader, to challenge Graham for the nomination. Graham easily bested Witherspoon in the June 10 primary.

First-time candidate Bob Conley, an airline pilot, was the Democratic nominee. Conley, whose victory in the Democratic primary over Michael Cone was a surprise, is a former Republican who supported Ron Paul in 2008 and campaigned as the more conservative candidate on some issues, notably illegal immigration and the bailout of Wall Street.

The South Carolina Working Families Party had also nominated Michael Cone. South Carolina's election law allows for electoral fusion. This was the first time the party nominated a candidate for statewide office. However, because he lost the Democratic primary, Cone was not listed on the ballot under the state's sore loser law.

Graham easily won re-election with 58% of the vote to Conley's 42%.

South Dakota 

In South Dakota, senator Tim Johnson's seat was considered a top GOP target in 2008, considering Johnson's narrow 524-vote victory in 2002 over then-Representative and current U.S. senator John Thune, as well as his recent health problems. Johnson underwent surgery in December 2006 for a cerebral arteriovenous malformation and was discharged from the hospital on April 30, 2007. On October 19, 2007, Johnson formally announced that he was seeking re-election. According to a November 2006 SurveyUSA poll, Johnson had an approval rating of 70%, with just 26% disapproving of his performance, making him an early favorite despite the state's Republican leaning.

Republicans were unsuccessful in persuading Governor Mike Rounds and former Lieutenant Governor Steve Kirby to run. State Representative Joel Dykstra announced his candidacy on July 5, 2007. Other Republicans included Charles Lyonel Gonyo and Sam Kephart. Dykstra won the Republican primary on June 3.

Johnson was re-elected, with 62.5% to Dykstra's 37.5%. This seat was the tipping point state in the 2008 senate elections.

Tennessee 

Former Governor and U.S. Secretary of Education Lamar Alexander was elected in 2002 to succeed retiring senator Fred Thompson. He has announced he will seek a second term in 2008. He was unopposed in the Republican primary.

Former Chairman of the Tennessee Democratic Party Bob Tuke was the Democratic nominee, defeating Businessman Gary Davis 30% to 23%. Knox County Clerk Mike Padgett received 20% of the vote.

2006 Green Party Senate nominee Chris Lugo originally announced as a Democrat but dropped out of the Democratic race before the filing deadline. He filed as an independent and was subsequently named as the Green Party nominee Edward Buck was also in the race.

Daniel Lewis ran as a Libertarian candidate for the United States Senate. He was certified March 3, 2008, by the Tennessee Division of Elections as having achieved ballot access for the November 4, 2008, election as a candidate for United States Senate. The Libertarian Party of Tennessee officially selected Daniel Lewis as their candidate for United States Senate on Saturday March 8, 2008, at their annual convention held in Nashville, Tennessee. Mr. Lewis was serving as the chairman of the Libertarian Party of Metropolitan Nashville and Davidson County. He ran for the Tennessee House in 2004.

Also reported to be in the race are David "None of the Above" Gatchell a ballot activist & frequent candidate and Emory "Bo" Heyward, a software company employee, conservative activist & 2006 candidate.

Alexander won the election with 65% of the vote.

Texas 

Texas has not elected a Democrat in a statewide election since 1994, but according to pre-election Rasmussen polling, senator John Cornyn had an approval rating of 50%. Texas House of Representatives member and Afghanistan War veteran Rick Noriega secured his place as Cornyn's Democratic challenger in the March 4 primary, beating out opponents Gene Kelly, Ray McMurrey, and Rhett Smith. The same Rasmussen poll showed Cornyn leading Noriega by a narrow four percentage points - 47% to 43%.

Christian activist Larry Kilgore of Mansfield, Texas, was a Republican challenger for the March 2008 primary election, but Cornyn easily won the Republican primary.

There were three Libertarians, including 2006 LP senate nominee Scott Jameson, running for their party's nomination. In addition, the Green Party of Texas sought ballot access for its candidate David B. Collins.

In the end, John Cornyn won re-election, 55%-43%

Virginia 

John Warner announced on August 31, 2007, that he would not seek re-election for another term. Former Governor Jim Gilmore, who dropped out of the 2008 presidential election, was the Republican nominee for the seat.
Popular Democratic former Governor Mark Warner (no relation) was the Democratic nominee for the race. Polling showed him as a strong favorite to win the seat.

When asked whether the Republicans were abandoning their hopes of holding onto Warner's seat, senator John Ensign, the chairman of the National Republican Senatorial Committee, responded that "You don’t waste money on races that don’t need it or you can’t win."

In one of the first senate races called on election day, Warner won, taking 65% of the vote, with Gilmore winning 34%. Since Democrat Jim Webb had defeated incumbent Republican George Allen for Virginia's other Senate seat in 2006, Virginia's senate delegation flipped from entirely Republican to entirely Democratic in just two years.

West Virginia 

Senator Jay Rockefeller, great-grandson of oil tycoon John D. Rockefeller, sought a fifth term representing West Virginia. Even though West Virginia is a historically Democratic state, in which the party had a 50-32% edge in party affiliation over the Republicans in the 2004 elections, the state party is more conservative than the national party, giving its votes to President George W. Bush in that election and in 2000. Democrats Sheirl Fletcher and Billy Hendricks challenged Rockefeller in the primary but were defeated. The Republican nominee was Jay Wolfe of Salem, a former State Senator.

Rockefeller handily won on election day, being re-elected with 64% of the vote. Wolfe had 36%.

Wyoming

Wyoming (regular) 

Incumbent Republican Mike Enzi was considered likely to be re-elected without significant opposition for a third term in strongly Republican Wyoming. His Democratic opponent was Chris Rothfuss, a professor at the University of Wyoming and a chemical engineer, nanotechnologist, and diplomat. Pre-election polling indicated that Enzi led Rothfuss by 24%.

Enzi won another term, 76%-24%.

Wyoming (special) 

Republican John Barrasso was appointed by Governor Dave Freudenthal (D) on June 22, 2007, to fill the senate seat of Republican Craig L. Thomas, who died on June 4. Wyoming law requires that the interim senator be affiliated with the same political party as the departed senator. Barrasso ran in the November 4, 2008, special election, held on the day of the 2008 presidential election, to serve out the remainder of Thomas's term, which expires in January 2013.

On the Democratic side, Casper City Councilman Keith Goodenough announced his candidacy. In the primary on August 19, Goodenough was defeated by a political newcomer, Gillette defense attorney Nick Carter, who became Barrasso's opponent in the general election.

Barrasso won on Election Day, taking 73% of the vote and winning every county in the state.

See also 

 2008 United States elections
 2008 United States gubernatorial elections
 2008 United States presidential election
 2008 United States House of Representatives elections
 110th United States Congress
 111th United States Congress

Notes

References

External links 

 Cook Political Report 2008 Senate Race Ratings
 CQ Politics Senate Analysis 
 Interactive Map of 2008 Senate Races
 Senate Newspaper Endorsement List
 FiveThirtyEight Senate Projections
 Intrade Composite Poll - Supermajority Predictions
 United States Election 2008 Web Archive from the U.S. Library of Congress
 List of Senate Newspaper Endorsements